Luis Manuel Navajas Ramos (born 17 December 1948) is a Spanish retired prosecutor. He served as Lieutenant Attorney of the Supreme Court —second highest position within the Prosecution Ministry— from 2014 to 2020 and acting Attorney General of the State in several occasions.

Career
He graduated in law, became professor between 1987 and 2003 of Crime Law at Basque Institute of Criminology and entered the judicial career in 1976. He was prosecutor of the Provincial Court of Guipúzcoa between 1987 and 2003. He became famous for his report that bears his name and that investigated some corrupt plots in the Intxarrurrondo barracks of the Guardia Civil and in which General Enrique Rodríguez was involved. Galindo The cause was shelved and received many criticisms of the environment of the fight against ETA.

Supreme Court Prosecutor 
In 2003 he was appointed prosecutor of the Criminal Chamber of the Supreme Court and he was appointed Lieutenant Attorney of the same court on 31 October 2014. As a lieutenant attorney of the Supreme Court, he requested the dismissal of the case against Judge Baltasar Garzón for having declared competent to investigate Francoist Spain, in spite of the pact of forgetting.

Acting Attorney General 
A month after being appointed Lieutenant Attorney, in December 2014, he assumed for the first time the position of Acting Attorney General of the State when Eduardo Torres-Dulce resigned from the post on 19 December 2014 and until Consuelo Madrigal did not take possession on 13 January 2015.

The second and most known term as attorney general was following the sudden death of José Manuel Maza in November 2017. It ceased in December, after the appointment of Julián Sánchez Melgar as attorney general. For a week, between June 22 and June 29, 2018, Navajas assumed the office until the definitive appointment of the prosecutor María José Segarra.

He hold the office acting again on 15 January 2020 when María José Segarra was ceased and until the taking of possession of Dolores Delgado on 26 February 2020.

Navajas retired in December 2020, at the age of 72 after 44 years of service.

See also
 Judiciary of Spain
 Spanish Attorney General
 2017 Spanish constitutional crisis
 Operation Anubis

References

1948 births
Living people
20th-century Spanish judges
Attorneys general of Spain
Prosecutors general of Spain
People from Granada